Auctor may refer to:

An author of a work, who is proficient in the subject matter
A scientist who first describes a species or other taxon
The seller at an auction
Octroi, a local tax 
Saint Auctor (c. 451), a bishop of Metz

See also
Auctoritas
Auctorum
Instigator (disambiguation)

Latin words and phrases